FC Halychyna Drohobych is an amateur football club from Drohobych, Ukraine. The club was created in place of SKA Karpaty Lviv and amateur club Avanhard Drohobych on December 2, 1989 as SFC Drohobych. 

Drohobych appeared in the Ukrainian Cup in 1999-2000, when they made the 1/16 round, and 2000-01. In 2003 the club lost its professional status   and competes in the Lviv Oblast Championship.

History
The club was created earlier in 1989 as Naftovyk Drohobych on the decision of the Drohobych city municipality and its head coach was appointed Jose Turchyk, a native of Buenos-Aires, Argentina whose family moved to the Soviet Union in the 1950s.

Competitions

Soviet Union

Ukraine

References

External links
 cached website

 
Football clubs in Drohobych
Amateur football clubs in Ukraine
Football clubs in the Ukrainian Soviet Socialist Republic
Association football clubs established in 1989
1989 establishments in Ukraine
Sports team relocations